Petya Barakova (born 18 June 1994) is a Bulgarian volleyball player, playing as a setter. She is part of the Bulgaria women's national volleyball team.

Career 
She competed at the 2015 European Games and 2015 Women's European Volleyball Championship.
She participated at the 2015 U23 FIVB Volleyball World Championship, the 2015 FIVB Volleyball World Grand Prix, the 2016 FIVB Volleyball World Grand Prix.
and 2021 Women's European Volleyball League, winning a gold medal.

On club level she plays for CS Volei Alba-Blaj.

Awards

Clubs
 2017–18 CEV Champions League -  Runner-Up, with CSM Volei Alba Blaj

References

External links

1994 births
Living people
Bulgarian women's volleyball players
Place of birth missing (living people)
Volleyball players at the 2015 European Games
European Games competitors for Bulgaria
Bulgarian expatriate sportspeople in Romania
Expatriate volleyball players in Romania
Setters (volleyball)